Steve Aoki Presents Kolony is the fourth studio album by American electronic musician Steve Aoki.

Track listing

Credits and personnel

 Steve Aoki – producer

Technical production
 Michael Piroli – mixing

Additional musicians
 Dominic Lalli – saxophone and producing in "$4,000,000"
 Jeremy Salken – percussion in "$4,000,000"

Charts

References 

2017 albums
Steve Aoki albums